El Chavo Kart (Chaves Kart in Brazil) is a 2014 kart racing game created by Colombian developer Efecto Studios and Mexican developer Slang and published by Televisa Home Entertainment for Xbox 360 and PlayStation 3. A conversion of the game was also released on Android, but was later removed. The game features almost all of the characters of El Chavo: The Animated Series (except for Jaimito and Gloria), with tracks loosely based on locations from the animated series. In 2020, an updated version of the game was released for iOS and Android with an updated art style reminiscent of Funko POP! toys.

Gameplay 

El Chavo Kart is a mascot-based kart racing game, in the same vein as Konami Krazy Racers, Nicktoons Racing, Mickey's Speedway USA, Diddy Kong Racing, Crash Team Racing and the Mario Kart series. Players get to compete as characters from the series (except for Jamito and Gloria), along with tracks loosely based on locations from the animated series.

The game offers three game modes: Cups, Exhibition, and Challenges. In "Cups", the player can unlock characters, while at the end of "Challenges" scenarios and tracks are unlocked. The player can collect power-ups along the race which can be used to benefit himself and gain an advantage in the race. Tracks include series features and scenarios such as Azteca Stadium, the city of Acapulco, the Maracana Stadium in Rio de Janeiro and also Stadium TFC in Toulouse. Each track can be raced in the opposite direction, and include alternative paths, traps and obstacles. The game features local multiplayer, allowing up to four players to compete against each other simultaneously. The game features 45 trophies or achievements that can be unlocked to progress through the game.

Development 
El Chavo Kart was announced by Roberto Gómez Fernández, son of Mexican comedian and series creator Roberto Gómez Bolaños known as "Chespirito", coinciding with Bolaños' 85th birthday in 2014, which was also the year of Bolaños' death. Voice actors from the animated series reprised their roles in the game.

The game is developed with Unreal Engine 3, and features graphics that mimic the series' art style. Each character has different animations that appear in races when the player hits or jumps, or win a race. Also, the development team took more than two years to carry out, as also with the participation of about 150 people in the studio.

The Brazilian version of the game (where it is given the title Chaves Kart) features Rio de Janeiro's Corcovado as the background image on the game's cover. The French version of the game (where it is also given the title Course avec Charlie) also features Toulouse's Pyrenees as the background image on the game's Xbox 360 cover.

Reception 
El Chavo Kart has received mixed reviews.

References

External links 

2014 video games
El Chavo del Ocho
Kart racing video games
PlayStation 3 games
Xbox 360 games
Multiplayer and single-player video games
Video games developed in Mexico
Video games set in Mexico
Android (operating system) games
Unreal Engine games
Video games with cel-shaded animation